Kruisstraat railway station was a railway station on the railway track Tilburg - Nijmegen. It was located near the village Kruisstraat ('s-Hertogenbosch) between Sprokkelbosch and Nuland. The railway station was opened in 1881 but was closed in 1938. The station has never been reopened.

Railway stations in 's-Hertogenbosch
Railway stations opened in 1881
Railway stations closed in 1938
1881 establishments in the Netherlands
Railway stations in the Netherlands opened in the 19th century